Aluminium nitride (AlN) is a solid nitride of aluminium. It has a high thermal conductivity of up to 321 W/(m·K) and is an electrical insulator. Its wurtzite phase (w-AlN) has a band gap of ~6 eV at room temperature and has a potential application in optoelectronics operating at deep ultraviolet frequencies.

History and physical properties
AlN was first synthesized in 1862 by F. Briegleb and A. Geuther.

AlN, in the pure (undoped) state has an electrical conductivity of 10−11–10−13 Ω−1⋅cm−1, rising to 10−5–10−6 Ω−1⋅cm−1 when doped. Electrical breakdown occurs at a field of 1.2–1.8 V/mm (dielectric strength).  

The material exists primarily in the hexagonal wurtzite crystal structure, but also has a metastable cubic zincblende phase, which is synthesized primarily in the form of thin films. It is predicted that the cubic phase of AlN (zb-AlN) can exhibit superconductivity at high pressures. In AlN wurtzite crystal structure, Al and N alternate along the c-axis, and each bond is tetrahedrally coordinated with four atoms per unit cell.

One of the unique intrinsic properties of wurtzite AlN is its spontaneous polarization. The origin of spontaneous polarization is the strong ionic character of chemical bonds in wurtzite AlN due to the large difference in electronegativity between aluminum and nitrogen atoms. Furthermore, the non-centrosymmetric wurtzite crystal structure gives rise to a net polarization along the c-axis. Compared with other III-nitride materials, AlN has a larger spontaneous polarization due to the higher nonideality of its crystal structure (Psp: AlN 0.081 C/m2 > InN 0.032 C/m2 > GaN 0.029 C/m2). Moreover, the piezoelectric nature of AlN gives rise to internal piezoelectric polarization charges under strain. These polarization effects can be utilized to induce a high density of free carriers at III-nitride semiconductor heterostructure interfaces completely dispensing with the need of intentional doping. Owing to the broken inversion symmetry along the polar direction, AlN thin film can be grown on either metal-polar or nitrogen-polar faces. Their bulk and surface properties depend significantly on this choice. The polarization effect is currently under investigation for both polarities. 

Critical spontaneous and piezoelectric polarization constants for AlN are listed in the table below:

AlN has high thermal conductivity, high-quality MOCVD-grown AlN single crystal has an intrinsic thermal conductivity of 321 W/(m·K), consistent with a first-principle calculation.  For an electrically insulating ceramic, it is 70–210 W/(m·K) for polycrystalline material, and as high as 285 W/(m·K) for single crystals).

AlN is one of the few materials that have both a wide and direct bandgap (almost twice that of SiC and GaN) and large thermal conductivity. This is due to its small atomic mass, strong interatomic bonds, and simple crystal structure. This property makes AlN attractive for application in high speed and high power communication networks. Many devices handle and manipulate large amounts of energy in small volumes and at high speeds, so due to the electrically insulating nature and high thermal conductivity of AlN, it becomes a potential material for high-power power electronics. Among group III-nitride materials, AlN has higher thermal conductivity compared to gallium nitride (GaN). Therefore, AlN is more advantageous than GaN in terms of heat dissipation in many power and radio frequency electronic devices.

Thermal expansivity is another critical property for high temperature applications. The calculated thermal expansion coefficients of AlN at 300 K are 4.2×10-6 K-1along a-axis and 5.3×10-6 K-1 along c-axis.

Stability and chemical properties
Aluminium nitride is stable at high temperatures in inert atmospheres and melts at about 2200 °C. In a vacuum, AlN decomposes at ~1800 °C. In the air, surface oxidation occurs above 700 °C, and even at room temperature, surface oxide layers of 5–10 nm thickness have been detected. This oxide layer protects the material up to 1370 °C. Above this temperature bulk oxidation occurs. Aluminium nitride is stable in hydrogen and carbon-dioxide atmospheres up to 980 °C.

The material dissolves slowly in mineral acids through grain-boundary attack and in strong alkalies through attack on the aluminium-nitride grains. The material hydrolyzes slowly in water. Aluminium nitride is resistant to attack from most molten salts, including chlorides and cryolite.

Aluminium nitride can be patterned with a Cl2-based reactive ion etch.

Manufacture

AlN is synthesized by the carbothermal reduction of aluminium oxide in the presence of gaseous nitrogen or ammonia or by direct nitridation of aluminium. The use of sintering aids, such as Y2O3 or CaO, and hot pressing is required to produce a dense technical-grade material.

Applications
Epitaxially grown thin film crystalline aluminium nitride is used for surface acoustic wave sensors (SAWs) deposited on silicon wafers because of AlN's piezoelectric properties. One application is an RF filter, widely used in mobile phones, which is called a thin-film bulk acoustic resonator (FBAR). This is a MEMS device that uses aluminium nitride sandwiched between two metal layers.

AlN is also used to build piezoelectric micromachined ultrasound transducers, which emit and receive ultrasound and which can be used for in-air rangefinding over distances of up to a meter.

Metallization methods are available to allow AlN to be used in electronics applications similar to those of alumina and beryllium oxide. AlN nanotubes as inorganic quasi-one-dimensional nanotubes, which are isoelectronic with carbon nanotubes, have been suggested as chemical sensors for toxic gases.

Currently there is much research into developing light-emitting diodes to operate in the ultraviolet using gallium nitride based semiconductors and, using the alloy aluminium gallium nitride, wavelengths as short as 250 nm have been achieved. In 2006, an inefficient AlN LED emission at 210 nm was reported.

AlN-based high electron mobility transistors (HEMTs) have attracted a high level of attention due to AlN’s superior properties, such as better thermal management, reduced buffer leakage, and excellent integration for all nitride electronics. AlN buffer layer is a critical building block for AlN-based HEMTs, and it has been grown by using MOCVD or MBE on different substrates. Building on top of AlN buffer, n-channel devices with 2D electron gas (2DEG) and p-channel devices with 2D hole gas (2DHG) have been demonstrated. The combination of high-density 2DEG and 2DHG on the same semiconductor platform makes it a potential candidate for CMOS devices.

Among the applications of AlN are
 opto-electronics,
 dielectric layers in optical storage media,
 electronic substrates, chip carriers where high thermal conductivity is essential,
 military applications,
 as a crucible to grow crystals of gallium arsenide,
 steel and semiconductor manufacturing.

See also
Boron nitride
Aluminium phosphide
Indium nitride
Aluminium oxynitride
Titanium aluminium nitride, TiAlN or AlTiN

References

Cited sources

Nitrides
Aluminium compounds
Piezoelectric materials
III-V semiconductors
Light-emitting diode materials
III-V compounds
Wurtzite structure type